The Lada 110 or VAZ-2110 is a compact car built by the Russian automaker AvtoVAZ from 1995 to 2009. It spawned two close derivatives: the Lada 111 estate and the Lada 112 hatchback.

History
The prototype of the Lada 110, known as the 300 series, was created in 1987 and optimized for aerodynamics in Zuffenhausen, Germany, in cooperation between AvtoVAZ and Porsche engineers. The first photos of the new compact car were published in the popular monthly magazine Za Rulem in November 1990, and the car itself was demonstrated at the AvtoVAZ Tolyatti factory in 1991. Serial production was planned to start in the following year, but an economic crisis stalled the project and the first cars did not roll off the assembly line until June 27, 1995. Production began with 8-valve engines; a 16 valve engine was offered later. Overall, the car weighed around 1050 kilograms (2315 lb). It had electric windows, trip computer, power steering, and galvanized body panels. Fuel-injected models were equipped with electronic engine management system. In early 2006, new taillights and a new dashboard were introduced.

The car was very successful in the domestic Russian market. It is still popular among taxi drivers in the Southern Federal District for the price-quality ratio.

In 2007, the Lada 110, 111 and 112 were restyled, modernised and relaunched as the Lada Priora.

Trim levels
There were three trim levels: Standard, Normal, and Luxe.

The Standard trim level included a clock, heated rear windows, power door locks, power trunk lock, onboard control system, immobilizer, body-color bumpers, tweed door and seat trims, and front head restraints. The Normal featured powered windows, exterior mirrors with antidazzle effect, velour seat and door upholstery, and rear head restraints. The Luxe added heated front seats, trip computer, fog lights, electric and heated outside mirrors, velvet seat and door upholstery, a trunk spoiler with integral brake lights, and tinted windows.

The model has been a favorite target for styling, both artisanal and professional, especially the version with the five-door hatchback body (Lada-112). Various companies from Tolyatti also designed and offered different body kits: APAL company produced components for the Lada BIS 110 and 111, as did Tornado, Katran, and Grossmeyster; AKS company of Kurage, Autostyle company of Tomcat, and Motorica did so for the Lada 110M (which was included in the official catalogue of AvtoVAZ and considered a restyled version of the original car), Pit-Stop produced the Grand Rally and Rally Sport versions, and Arsenal-Auto built the Sprint. Super-Avto developed a version with a motor of 1.8 liters of its own design and an elongated version of the sedan VAZ-21108 Premier; it was included in the official catalogues of AvtoVAZ. The Motorica company produced the sporting VAZ-21106 version with a  Opel engine, altered rear wings, and extended wheel arches. Enterprise, together with AvtoVAZ, produced the Consul in 1999-2006, along with the four-wheel drive Tarzan-2 built on the basis of the station wagon Lada 111, with a raised body placed on a separate frame.

Ukrainian production
In 2007, the 110 was discontinued by Lada; however, Bogdan continued to produce it as the Bogdan 2110 for the Ukrainian market until 2014. Foreign production in Egypt lasted until 2015.

Safety
In 2002 the car was awarded zero stars out of a possible four by the Russian ARCAP safety assessment program. The reviewers noted that the injury criteria did not exceed safe values, the car's interior was well thought out in terms of safety, and the car's body was very rugged, showing better results than those of Nissan Almera, Ford Escort, Mitsubishi Lancer, Hyundai Accent, and Suzuki Baleno. However, the compression of the chest by the seat belt was too high, and the reviewers concluded that the car needed airbags and more modern safety belts equipped with pretensioners and tension limiters to keep up with the new safety standards.

Racing

The Lada 110 was entered in the 2008 World Touring Car Championship season by the Russian Bears Motorsport team, with Viktor Shapovalov (#28) and Jaap van Lagen (#29) as the drivers.

Team LADA Sport commenced the 2009 World Touring Car Championship season with a trio of 110s  for Jaap Van Lagen, Kirill Ladygin and Viktor Shapovalov. The team replaced the 110s with the newer Prioras during the course of the season.

Lada 111

The Lada 111 or VAZ-2111 is AvtoVAZ's front wheel drive car with a station wagon bodystyle (modification of Lada 110). It was manufactured from 1998 to 2009. The vehicle is still manufactured in Cherkasy by Bogdan, marketed as the "Bogdan 2111", with only minor alterations.

In 1998, the Lada 110 received a modification for a station wagon - the Lada 111 - the country's first front-wheel drive car with such a bodystyle. The rear seat can be folded in a ratio of 2:3, allowing passengers and bulky/long loads. The luggage compartment, respectively, increase from 490 to 1,420 liters. Front-wheel drive and a rear door give it a low loading height. With a 20 kg total increase in weight and a higher center of mass, wagon's ride is smoother than the sedan's but the handling is not as good in turns.

The wagon was released with options that differ mainly by engine: basic VAZ-21110 With the "standard", "normal" and "luxury" (similar to a sedan car VAZ-21102) with a 1.5-liter 8-valve engine, "2111" and "top-end"VAZ-21113 to trim the" norm "and" luxury "with 16-valve engine," 2112 "and front ventilated disc brakes (like the sedan VAZ-21103). The "2111" and "2112" were equipped with fuel injection and catalytic converter. The VAZ-21111 had a carburetor engine "2110" (production ended in 2002). All-rounders are completed with the "short" primary pair (3.9 instead of 3.7 for VAZ-2110). Since autumn 2004, these versions been taken over by the 1.6-liter 21112 (8 valves) and 21114 (16 valves). The other innovations are those of the 2110.

Modifications 
 LADA-21111 (VAZ-21111) — 1.5 liters carburetor engine;
 LADA-21109 (VAZ-21109) «Consul» — 16-valve 1.6-liter 89 hp 21124-engine with  fuel injection (Limo);
 LADA-21110 (VAZ-21110) — 8-valve engine with capacity of 1.5 liters with fuel injection (Lada 111 1.5 Li);
 LADA-21113 (VAZ-21113) — 16-valve engine with capacity of 1.5 liters with fuel injection;
 LADA-21112 (VAZ-21112) — 8-valve 1.6-liter 80 hp 21114-engine with  fuel injection;
 LADA-21114 (VAZ-21114) — 16-valve 1.6-liter 89 hp 21124-engine with  fuel injection;
 LADA-21116 (VAZ-21116-04) - 2.0-liter 150 hp engine Opel C20XE, four-wheel drive;
 VAZ-2111-90 «Tarzan-2» - body of VAZ-21111 and chassis of Niva, 1.8-liter (80 and 85 hp versions) engine and four-wheel drive (SUV)
 VAZ-2111-90 «Pilgrim» - body of VAZ-21111 and chassis of Niva, 1.8-liter (80 and 85 hp versions) engine and four-wheel drive (SUV-Pickup)

Lada 112

The Lada 112 or VAZ-2112 is a hatchback car produced by Russian auto manufacturer AvtoVAZ, under the Lada brand. The Lada 112 was introduced in 1999, and is somewhat more modern and luxurious-looking than the traditional Ladas. The car is relatively popular in Russia today. It came with a five-speed gearbox and rear drum brakes. Its weight is between 1,050 (2,315 lb) and 1230 kg's.

Variants
AvtoVAZ also provided a 112 Coupe variant, with just three doors instead of five in base model.

It was dropped from the Lada model range in 2008, with the launch of the Lada Priora hatchback.

References

110
Compact cars
Sedans
Cars of Russia
Touring cars
ARCAP small family cars
1990s cars
2000s cars
2010s cars